Elections to the Wiltshire Council unitary authority took place on 2 May 2013. All ninety-eight seats were up for election, with each councillor being elected in a single-member electoral division, although in six of the divisions only one candidate was nominated and was thus declared the winner without elections taking place.

The previous elections were held in June 2009 and resulted in the Conservatives taking overall control of the newly formed council, the successor to Wiltshire County Council and four recently abolished district councils, with the Liberal Democrats forming the largest of four opposition political groups. At the 2013 election, the Conservatives were the only political party to contest every division. They needed to avoid a net loss of thirteen seats to maintain overall control, while the Liberal Democrats needed a net gain of twenty-six to take control. In the event, the Conservatives gained five seats and lost nine, a net loss of four, retaining control of the council with fifty-eight members. The Liberal Democrats remained the largest other group, with twenty-seven councillors, followed by eight Independents, four from the Labour Party, and one from the United Kingdom Independence Party (UKIP), the first time a seat in Wiltshire Council had been won by UKIP.

Uncontested elections
At the close of nominations on 5 April 2013, in six electoral divisions only one candidate had come forward, so these were uncontested: they were Fovant & Chalke Valley (Josephine Green), Ludgershall & Perham (Christopher Williams), the Collingbournes & Netheravon (Charles Howard), Tidworth (Mark Connolly), Warminster West (Pippa Ridout), and Winterslow (Christopher Devine). These six candidates were all Conservatives and were elected unopposed.

Composition before election

Overall results

|}

Results by county divisions

Aldbourne and Ramsbury

Alderbury and Whiteparish

Amesbury East

Amesbury West

Bourne and Woodford Valley

Box and Colerne

Bradford-on-Avon North

Bradford-on-Avon South

Brinkworth

Bromham, Rowde and Potterne

(Note: at a by-election in May 2015 this seat was held by Anna Cuthbert for the Conservatives. For the election result, see Wiltshire Council elections.)

Bulford, Allington and Figheldean

Burbage and the Bedwyns

By Brook

Calne Central

Calne Chilvester and Abberd

Calne North

Calne Rural

Calne South and Cherhill

Chippenham Cepen Park and Derriads

Chippenham Cepen Park and Redlands

Chippenham Hardenhuish

(Note: at a by-election in May 2015 this seat was gained by the Conservatives represented by Melody Thompson, who had been the Independent candidate in 2013. For the election result, see Wiltshire Council elections.)

Chippenham Hardens and England

Chippenham Lowden and Rowden

Chippenham Monkton

Chippenham Pewsham

Chippenham Queens and Sheldon

Corsham Pickwick

Corsham Town

Corsham Without and Box Hill

Cricklade and Latton

Devizes and Roundway South

Devizes East

Devizes North

Downton and Ebble Valley

Durrington and Larkhill

Ethandune

(Note: following the death of Linda Conley, a by-election took place on 6 March 2014 and the Ethandune seat was held by Jerry Wickham for the Conservatives. For the election result, see Wiltshire Council elections.)

Fovant and Chalke Valley

Hilperton

Holt and Staverton

Kington

Laverstock, Ford and Old Sarum

Ludgershall and Perham Down

Lyneham

Malmesbury

Marlborough East

Marlborough West

Melksham Central

Melksham North

Melksham South

Melksham Without North

Melksham Without South

Mere

Minety

Nadder and East Knoyle

Pewsey

Pewsey Vale

Purton

Redlynch and Landford

Roundway

Royal Wootton Bassett East

Royal Wootton Bassett North

Royal Wootton Bassett South

Salisbury Bemerton

Salisbury Fisherton and Bemerton Village

Salisbury Harnham

Salisbury St Edmund and Milford

Salisbury St Francis and Stratford

Salisbury St Marks and Bishopdown

Salisbury St Martins and Cathedral

Salisbury St Pauls

Sherston

Southwick

Summerham and Seend

The Collingbournes and Netheravon

The Lavingtons and Erlestoke

Tidworth

Till and Wylye Valley

Tisbury

Trowbridge Adcroft

Trowbridge Central

Trowbridge Drynham

Trowbridge Grove

Trowbridge Lambrok

Trowbridge Park

Trowbridge Paxcroft

Urchfont and The Cannings

Warminster Broadway

Warminster Copheap and Wylye

Warminster East

Warminster West

Warminster Without

West Selkley

Westbury East

Westbury North

Westbury West

Wilton and Lower Wylye Valley

Winsley and Westwood

Winterslow

By-elections between 2013 and 2017

Ethandune

Bromham, Rowde and Potterne

Chippenham Hardenhuish

Salisbury St Edmund and Milford

Amesbury East

Trowbridge Grove

References
Election results at the Wiltshire Council website

2013 English local elections
2013
2010s in Wiltshire